Osney Rail Bridge is a railway bridge over the River Thames at Oxford in England. It carries the Cherwell Valley Line between Didcot and Oxford across the river on the reach between Iffley Lock and Osney Lock.

The original bridge was built in 1850, when the Great Western Railway built a new line from its original Oxford station at Grandpont to Rugby.  The north side of the bridge was on the island which was then called Osney.  A second bridge was built in 1887 within a foot or so of the first bridge.

The bridge is maintained by Network Rail, who refer to the bridge as River Isis Crossing.

See also
 Crossings of the River Thames

References

1850 establishments in England
Bridges completed in 1887
Bridges across the River Thames
Railway bridges in Oxfordshire